The Bubble Baba Challenge is an event held in the rapids of Vuoksi River in Russia whereby contestants race in the water using sex dolls as flotation devices. It began in 2003 and is staged every year. In 2011 around 800 people participated in the race, but in 2012 it was banned by the authorities because of "dangerously high water levels" work that was being done to repair the roads and rail bridges downstream. Organisers disputed the ban, claiming that it was only effected as part of a country-wide clamp down on mass gatherings.

Participants of either gender are allowed to compete but are required to be aged 16 or over and must pass a compulsory alcohol test.

Event has been restarted in 2021.

References

Swimming in Russia
Swimming competitions in Russia